The Kistler House is a historic house at 945 Beacon Street in Newton, Massachusetts.  The -story wood-frame house was built in 1893, and is one of Newton Center's most elaborate Colonial Revival houses.  It has a veranda that wraps around two sides of the house, although a porch shelters the front facade.  The porch is supported by clusters of slender columns, with a projecting central section framing the main entrance, which has leaded glass sidelight windows.  A Palladian window stands above the main entrance, and the cornice line is embellished with egg-and-dart moulding, dentil moulding, and a frieze decorated with swags.  Andrew Kistler, the owner, was a leather dealer working in Boston.

The house was listed on the National Register of Historic Places in 1986.

See also
 National Register of Historic Places listings in Newton, Massachusetts

References

Houses on the National Register of Historic Places in Newton, Massachusetts
Colonial Revival architecture in Massachusetts
Houses completed in 1893